5th Reconnaissance Group may refer to:
 The 26th Tactical Reconnaissance Wing, which was designated the 5th Reconnaissance Group in 1945
 The 5th Operations Group, which was designated the 5th Reconnaissance Group, Very Long Range, Photographic from 1947 to 1949 

005